The 2012 Angola Cup (Taça de Angola) was the 31st edition of what is considered the second most important (and the top knock-out) football club competition in Angola, following the Girabola. Petro de Luanda beat Rec da Caála 1–0 in the final to secure its 9th title.

The winner and the runner-up qualified to 2013 CAF Confederation Cup.

Stadia and locations

Championship bracket

Preliminary rounds

Round of 16

Quarter-finals

Semi-finals

Final

See also
 2012 Girabola
 2013 Angola Super Cup
 2013 CAF Confederation Cup
 Petro de Luanda players
 Recreativo da Caála players

External links
 Tournament profile at girabola.com
 Tournament profile at rsssf.com

References

Angola Cup
Taca de Angola
Taca de Angola